Sam Chegini is an Iranian music video director, filmmaker, animator, graphic designer, video editor and puppeteer born in Tehran in 1992 in an artistic family. He has directed videos for Chris de Burgh, Gentle Giant, Jethro Tull, King Crimson's frontman, Jakko M Jakszyk and Lenny Henry.

Career
Chegini started at the local TV as a puppeteer at the age of 14. He then followed his passion for film and animation at the age of 16.
In 2009 Chegini joined VOP (Voice of Peace), a group that worked on reconstructing ancient Persian musical instruments, sponsored by United Nations Human Settlements Programme and IAARA. He made the artistic film The Lyre of Mesopotamia, which received an award for best video art in the 1st Persbookart Contest on Facebook in 2010.

In 2011 Dutch singer/songwriter [Linde Nijland asked him to make a music video for her song "Traveller", after having seen a video he made for the song A Spaceman Came Travelling by Chris de Burgh. Traveller has been the official selection of many prestigious music video and film festivals around the globe and has been screened in different countries so far. In 2013, Chegini won the Royal Reel Award from Canada International Film Festival for this music video and it was also voted no. 1 in the Frisian charts in the Klipkar+TV program.

in 2016 Chegini made an animated music video for British comedian  Sir Lenny Henry, titled "The Cops Don't Know" produced by  British record producer, Chris Porter, which was premiered on Classic Rock Magazine on April 20, 2016. Henry praised the video in his interview with Classic Rock Magazine saying the video has a "labour of love" style and "Sam is clearly gifted."

in 2017 he joined Verbatim Theater Group for the play MANUS, directed by Nazanin Sahamizadeh. As Video Artist, Video Mapper and International affairs, Chegini worked with the team in 3 International festivals including the 36th Fajr International Theater Festival (Tehran, Iran), 2 performances in Bangladesh, (Chittagong and Dhaka) and 10th International Theatre Festival of Kerala (Thrissur, Kerala, India).

As Artistic Director, Chegini organized the 9th Wordless International Short Film Festival in the city of Qazvin, Iran, same time screening with Sydney, Australia in November 2017.

In August 2018,  "SamChats" had its first premiere on YouTube, an online talk show interviewing the most successful international artists worldwide, designated for the Persian speaking audience for the first time held by Sam Chegini. In the first season, Neil Taylor, Lena Katina, Ayda Mosharaf and Alex Jolig have appeared on the show.

In 2019, during the pandemic of COVID-19, Chegini directed a music video for King Crimson's frontman, Jakko M Jakszyk, titled "The Trouble with Angels". Jakszyk praised Chegini's work in a comment saying: "The first single, ‘The Trouble With Angels, makes its debut on the 14th August, 2020. Complete with an extraordinary animated video by Iranian filmmaker Sam Chegini. And getting that made amidst the pandemic is a whole other story!!"   In an exclusive interview with Prog magazine, Jakko opens the story, explaining the unusual production process of the video because of the pandemic of COVID-19 along with a very bad political climate in Iran, to which Prog Magazine headline reads: "Worldwide political upheaval almost derails the shoot for King Crimson singer Jakko Jakszyks recent promo video".

"The video looks amazing, but what’s most amazing is that we managed to make it at all" said Jakko Jakszyk, explaining the difficult online production of the animated video. In  another interview with Prog, the British journalist/TV presenter Matthew Wright describes the video saying: "I havent seen anything quite like it! Its not just visually stunning, the story behind the video is worth telling."  In the same interview, Jakszyk explains about their first collaboration in the making of the video for Sir Lenny Henrys "The Cops Dont Know" which led to their second and third collaborations, "The Trouble with Angels" and "Uncertain Times".

Later in 2020, "Uncertain Times", another animated music video for Jakko Jakszyk directed by Sam Chegini and starring the renowned British Actor, Comedian, Al Murray was released on October 9, 2020 from InsideOut Music.

In 2021, an official music video for "Aqualung" was released by Warner Music on the occasion of the album's 50th Anniversary. The Aqualung video directed by Sam Chegini was premiered on Rolling Stone on April 1, 2021. Jethro Tull's frontman, Ian Anderson, praised Chegini in his statement to Rolling Stone saying: “At the suggestion of my pal, Jakko Jaksyzk of King Crimson, I contacted a young Iranian videographer/director, Sam Chegini; He delivered a unique rendition of the ‘Aqualung’ song with abstract and documentary-type footage. A talented young man with a bright future in the music arts.”

On April 21, 2021 on the occasion of World Creativity and Innovation Day, the virtual event "Creativity For Urban Future" was held by UN-Habitat and Urban+Future. Alongside the screening of the video "Aqualung" directed by Sam Chegini at the virtual event, he gave a speech about "Limitations that can lead to Creativity and Innovation" based on his experiences making videos.

On April 30, 2021 Gentle Giant announced the release date of a remixed version of their 1975 album "Free Hand" by Steven Wilson with custom-visuals for all tracks. The title track "Free Hand" is directed and animated by Sam Chegini. The release date is June 25, 2021.

On October 15, 2021 British-Irish singer/songwriter, Chris de Burgh released a music video for his single "Legacy" directed by Sam Chegini. The animated music video that was released on de Burgh's 73rd Birthday is produced for his 27th Studio album "The Legend of Robin Hood".

On January 28, 2022, Jethro Tull's new album "The Zealot Gene" was released. An album of new materials in over 2 decades, featuring 2 music videos directed by Sam Chegini. "Sad City Sisters" and "The Zealot Gene".

Chegini is also a member of the United Nations Alliance of Civilizations Intercultural Leaders.

Filmography

Puppetry

Awards

Best Music Video - Tassvir Film Festival, for Chris de Burgh's Legacy
Best Music Video - Cannes World Film Festival, for The Trouble with Angels (2021)
Honorable Mention - 39th New Jersey International Film Festival, for The Trouble with Angels (2021)
Best Music Video Award, Stockholm Monthly Film Festival, for The Trouble with Angels (2020)
 Plural+ FERA-LUCERO Award, United Nations Plural+ Youth Video Festival, for The Cops Don't Know (2016)
 Best Music Video Award, ShortPole London, for The Cops Don't Know (2016)
 Music Video of the Month, The Monthly Film Festival, for The Cops Don't Know (2016)
 Best Music Video, The Motion Picture Film Festival, USA for Emotions of Tomorrow (2016)
 Best short of the week, Reel13 WNET, PBS for Traveller music video (2014)
 The Royal Reel Award for Traveller music video – Canada International Film Festival (2013)
 1st place – Music Video Category for Traveller – 9th Annual MY HERO International Film Festival 2013
 2nd place – Experimental/Music Video category for Traveller – The 6th Annual Boomtown Film and Music Festival, Texas (2013)
 3rd place – Best Film Poster for Maybe Sky – 11th Iranian Youth Cinema Society Film Festival (2011)
 Best Video Art The Lyre of Mesopotamia, Persbook Art Festival, Iran (2009)

Notes

References
 Persbookart winners - Persbookart official website
 Folkforum report of the Noordfolk festival
 'Traveller' music video on Protoclip festival website

External links
Official website

Facebook fanpage

1992 births
Living people